Ollamh Síol Muireadaigh was a hereditary post, held almost exclusively by members of the Ó Maolconaire family, from at latest the 13th century until the 17th century. The Síol Muireadaigh were a dynasty of regional clans, named after King Muiredach Muillethan of Connacht (died 702), all of whom lived in north-central Connacht. While many of the ruling chieftains such as the Ó Conchubhair Donn, Ó Conchubhair Ruadh, Mac Diarmata, and Ó Flannagain were descendants of this Muiredach Muillethan, the Ó Maolconaires are of Laiginian, or mythically of Tuatha Dé Dannan stock, although their Milesian pedigrees claim differently. The Laiginians arrived in Connacht in the 3rd century AD from Leinster, conquering the ruling Fir Bolg and Fomorians, and ruling until conquered by the Gael under the Connachta in the 5th century.

An ollamh was the highest rank in the learned orders of law, poetry, or history.  These educated professionals, today grouped together in the popular consciousness as "bards", maintained  an oral tradition that pre-dated Christianization of Ireland.

It is likely that the post had existed for at least as long as the Síl Muireadaigh dynasty themselves, but earlier ollamhs are unknown.  The first of the family so listed was Dúinnín Ó Maolconaire.

List of Ollamhs
Dúinnín Ó Maolconaire, died 1213
Máeleoin Bódur Ó Maolconaire, died 1266
Dubsúilech Ó Maolconaire
Tanaide Mor mac Dúinnín Ó Maolconaire, 1270–1310
Mael Sechlainn Ó Domhnalláin, Ollav of Sil-Murray in particular in poetry, and the most learned man in all Ireland in the same art, died of Fiolun in 1375.
Tanaide Ó Maolconaire, died 1385
Donnchad Baccach Ó Maolconaire, died 1404
Flann Óc mac Séoan Ó Domhnalláin, died 1404
Dauid mac Tanaide Ó Maolconaire, died 1419
Cormac Ó Domhnalláin, died 1436
Mailin mac Tanaide Ó Maolconaire, died 1441.
Sadhbh Ó Mailchonaire, died 1447.
Torna Ó Maolconaire, died 1468
Urard Ó Maolconaire, died 1482
Sigraid Ó Maolconaire, died 1487
Mailin mac Torna Ó Maolconaire, died 1519
Torna mac Torna Ó Maolconaire, died 1532
Conchobar mac Domnall Ruad Ó Maolconaire 1532 - 15??
Muirges mac Paidin Ó Maolconaire?, d.1543
Lochlainn mac Paidin Ó Maolconaire, died 1551

See also

 Ollamh Érenn
 Ollamh Tuisceairt
 Ollamh Airgialla
 Ollamh Ulaidh
 Ollamh Laigin
 Ollamh Osraighe
 Ollamh Desmumu
 Ollamh Thomond
 Ollamh Mumu
 Ollamh Ormond
 Cllamh Ui Maine
 Ollamh Connachta - 1416:Tomas Mac ind Oclaig, erenagh of Killery and chief master of Law in Connacht, died after a victory of repentance.
 Ollamh Clanricarde - 1438.3:Conchobar Mac Aedacain, ollav of Macwilliam of Clanrickard, died.
 Ollamh Ui Fiachrach - 1414: Donnchad Mac Fir Bisig, prospective ollav of the Uí Fiachrach Muaide, died this year.

Sources

The Encyclopaedia of Ireland 2003; .
 Mac Dermot of Moylurg: The Story of a Connacht Family Dermot Mac Dermot, 1996.
A New History of Ireland VIII: A Chronology of Irish History to 1976 - A Companion to Irish History Part I edited by T.W. Moody, F.X. Martin and F.J. Byrne, 1982. 
The Celebrated Antiquary Nollaig O Muralie, Maynooth, 1996.
Irish Leaders and Learning Through the Ages Fr. Paul Walsh, 2004. (ed. Nollaig O Muralie).

External links
List of Published Texts at CELT — University College Cork's Corpus of Electronic Texts

Irish chroniclers
Medieval Irish poets
Medieval Irish historians
Irish male poets